Hulme Hall in Port Sunlight, on the Wirral Peninsula in Merseyside, England, is a Grade II listed building, first registered as such in 1965.

History
The building was designed by William Owen and his son, Segar. Built in 1901 as a women's dining hall, it became an art gallery from 1911, housing some of the collection of William Lever, 1st Viscount Leverhulme, prior to its removal to the Lady Lever Art Gallery around 1922. During World War I, the artworks were packed away and the building housed refugees from Belgium.

The Beatles gave four performances at Hulme Hall, the first on 7 July 1962. On 18 August 1962, Hulme Hall served as the venue for Ringo Starr's first official performance as a Beatle following the sacking of Pete Best; the band's first performance as the Fab Four. Other shows followed on 6 and 27 October 1962.

Recent use
It has been used as a community centre and, it is used as a conference, banqueting and wedding centre.

See also 

Listed buildings in Merseyside

References

External links 

Grade II listed buildings in Merseyside
Buildings and structures completed in 1901